The 1965 Minnesota Golden Gophers football team represented the University of Minnesota in the 1965 Big Ten Conference football season. In their 12th year under head coach Murray Warmath, the Golden Gophers compiled a 5–4–1 record and outscored their opponents by a combined total of 188 to 160.
 
Quarterback John Hankinson received the team's Most Valuable Player award. End Aaron Brown was named an All-American by the Associated Press, Look magazine, United Press International, Collier's/Grantland Rice and Football Writers Association of America. Brown was also named All-Big Ten first team.

Total attendance at six home games was 302,747, an average of 50,458 per game. The largest crowd was against Michigan.

Schedule

Game summaries

Michigan

Source:

References

Minnesota
Minnesota Golden Gophers football seasons
Minnesota Golden Gophers football